, since 1999 married Schmitt (born 20 October 1975 in Magdeburg, Saxony-Anhalt) is a German shot putter.

Her personal best throw is 20.20 metres, achieved in August 2009 in Berlin. She competed at four Summer Olympic Games, from 2000 to 2012.

Achievements

References

External links
 
 
 
 
 
 
 

1975 births
Living people
Sportspeople from Magdeburg
German female shot putters
German national athletics champions
Athletes (track and field) at the 2000 Summer Olympics
Athletes (track and field) at the 2004 Summer Olympics
Athletes (track and field) at the 2008 Summer Olympics
Athletes (track and field) at the 2012 Summer Olympics
Olympic athletes of Germany
Olympic silver medalists for Germany
World Athletics Championships medalists
European Athletics Championships medalists
Medalists at the 2004 Summer Olympics
Olympic silver medalists in athletics (track and field)
Competitors at the 1998 Goodwill Games